Larbi-Odam v MEC for Education (North-West Province) is a 1997 judgment of the Constitutional Court of South Africa which held that a government policy forbidding the employment of non-citizens (including permanent residents) in permanent teaching positions, was unconstitutional. Although citizenship is not one of the prohibited grounds for discrimination listed in the equality clause of South Africa's Constitution, the court found unanimously that in this case discrimination against non-citizens was unfair. It came to this decision because non-citizens are necessarily a minority with little political power, and because citizenship is a personal attribute which is difficult to change.

References

External links
 Text of the judgment at SAFLII

Constitutional Court of South Africa cases
South African labour case law
1997 in case law
1997 in South African law